Youssef Wael Aboushousha (born 9 June 1993), also known as Youssef Shousha, is an Egyptian basketball player for Al Ittihad Alexandria. He played for the Egyptian national team, where he participated at the 2014 FIBA Basketball World Cup.

References

1993 births
Living people
Egyptian men's basketball players
Power forwards (basketball)
Small forwards
African Games silver medalists for Egypt
African Games medalists in basketball
2014 FIBA Basketball World Cup players
Competitors at the 2015 African Games
Alexandria Sporting Club players
Al Ittihad Alexandria Club basketball players